Munduney Station is a pastoral lease that operates as a sheep station in South Australia.

 
The station was established some time prior to 1884, when it was already producing wool for London markets. John Davies owned the station in 1902. By 1912 the property was carrying a flock of 16,000 sheep.

The University of Adelaide sold the property in 2011 for approximately 20 million. It had been bequeathed to the University and Prince Alfred College by the estate of J.S. Davies. The sale included all plant and equipment along with the 11,000 sheep the property was stocked with. The property also boasted  of planted crops and 18 wind turbines that would supply revenue until 2033.

See also
List of ranches and stations

References

Pastoral leases in South Australia
Stations (Australian agriculture)